West Denton Warehouse-Wharf is a historic warehouse located at West Denton, Caroline County, Maryland.  It is an early-20th century timber-framed warehouse structure situated along the west bank of the upper Choptank River. The earliest section was built about 1850, and is the 40 foot x 100 foot center portion. The north (40 foot x 20 foot) and south (40 foot x 40 foot) additions were built in the 1940s.  It is a representative example of a type of structure which served various functions in connection with waterborne commerce, and is one of only two remaining riverfront warehouses in Maryland.

It was listed on the National Register of Historic Places in 2000.

References

External links
, including photo from 1998, at Maryland Historical Trust

Commercial buildings on the National Register of Historic Places in Maryland
Buildings and structures in Caroline County, Maryland
Commercial buildings completed in 1850
Transport infrastructure completed in 1850
National Register of Historic Places in Caroline County, Maryland